Marco Erickson is an American politician and psychologist serving as a member of the Idaho House of Representatives from the 33rd district. Elected in November 2020, he assumed office on December 1, 2020.

Early life and education 
Erickson was born in Montana and raised in Boise, Idaho. He earned a Bachelor of Science degree in psychology from Montana State University Billings and a Master of Science in psychology from Walden University.

Career 
Erickson has worked as a psycho-social rehabilitation (PSR) worker for several organizations. From 2014 to 2017, he was a project coordinator for the Nevada Department of Education. In 2019, he was a prevention specialist for the East Idaho Public Health District. He was also a health program manager in the Nevada Division of Public and Behavioral Health.

Erickson was elected to the Idaho House of Representatives in November 2020. He assumed office on December 1, 2020.

References

Living people
People from Boise, Idaho
Montana State University Billings alumni
Walden University alumni
Republican Party members of the Idaho House of Representatives
Year of birth missing (living people)